Gonzalo Tassier is a Mexican graphic designer and publicity specialist from Mexico City, who has created a number of highly recognized logos and trademarks in Mexico. He was born in Mexico City in 1941. In his youth, he studied at the UNAM School of Architecture, then he studied philosophy for four years, before joining a religious community called the Missionaries of the Holy Spirit. However, as a designer, he is self-taught.

His career has spanned over four decades to become of the most outstanding and pioneering graphic designers in Mexico. He has worked for offices such as those of Giancarlo Novi, Design Center and Bozell. Tassier’s best-known work includes the logo for PEMEX (created with Francisco Teuscher), the trademarks for Del Fuerte and Aguigol and the eagle which has been used for the Mexico national football team since 1998. He has also designed brochures for Ford and Wyeth, audiovisual work for IMSS and book covers for the Demac publishing company.
  

In 1995, Tassier founded his own agency called Retorno Tassier, dedicated to graphic design, publishing and general publicity, located in Mexico City. The agency works with numerous Mexican and international companies along with governmental agencies and other organizations. The firm also does work for a number of non-profit organizations as a social service. Clients include Santander Group, Volkswagen of Mexico and the United Nations Industrial Development Organization.

Tassier remains with his agency as president. Another independent firm Tassier created with partner Bruno Newman is La Gunilla Editores, a publishing house whose books focus on design and collecting. The name is a play on "Lagunilla", a community which has a famous market for collectors.

In 2002, he received honors from the Quórum organization, which also published a book about his career.

Tassier is a professor of design at the Universidad Iberoamericana, and is considered to be one of the most respected teachers of this field in the country. In 2008, he was awarded the Sir Misha Black Medal for his teaching work in London, after being nominated by a group of his students. He is the first Latino to receive the award in thirty years.

His style is considered to be original and sensitive as well as methodical and perfectionist. Tassier believes that laughter is a fundamental ingredient in promotion, that good commercials will evoke a smile and positive emotion.

The Museo del Objeto held an exhibition of Tassier’s work in October 2011, as part of the “El MODO de ….” (The Manner of...) series.  In addition to drawings and design, the exhibit also included Tassier’s pencil collection, which has over 11,000 pieces. The pencil collection represents the importance that the implement has for his work.

References

People from Mexico City
Mexican designers
Living people
Year of birth missing (living people)